South Lanarkshire was a county constituency of the House of Commons of the Parliament of the United Kingdom (Westminster) from 1868 to 1918. It elected one Member of Parliament (MP) by the first past the post voting system.

Boundaries 

The Representation of the People (Scotland) Act 1868 provided that the South Lanarkshire constituency was to consist of the parishes of Biggar, Cambusnethan, Carluke, Carmichael, Carnwath, Carstairs, Covington and Thankerton, Crawford, Crawfordjohn, Dalserf, Dolphinton, Douglas, Dunsyre, Lanark, Lesmahagow, Libberton, Pitinain, Shotts, Stonehouse, Walston, Wandell and Lamington, Wiston and Roberton, and so much of the parishes of Culter and Moffat as is situated in the County of Lanark.

The Redistribution of Seats Act 1885 provided that the constituency was to consist of:
the parishes of Biggar, Carluke, Carmichael, Carnwath, Carstairs, Covington and Thankerton, Crawford, Crawfordjohn, Culter, Dolphinton, Douglas, Dunsyre, Lamington and Wandel, Lanark, Lesmahagow, Liberton, Pettinain, Symington, Walston, Wiston and Roberton, Moffat, Avondale, Stonehouse, Glasford, and East Kilbride; so much of the parish of Cathcart as adjoins East Kilbride, and so much of the parish of Kirkpatrick-Juxta as may be in the county of Lanark.

Members of Parliament

Elections

Elections in the 1860s

Elections in the 1870s

Elections in the 1880s

Elections in the 1890s

Elections in the 1900s

Elections in the 1910s 

General Election 1914–15:

Another General Election was required to take place before the end of 1915. The political parties had been making preparations for an election to take place and by the July 1914, the following candidates had been selected; 
Unionist: William Watson
Liberal: George Morton
Labour:

References 

Lanarkshire
Historic parliamentary constituencies in Scotland (Westminster)
Constituencies of the Parliament of the United Kingdom disestablished in 1918
Constituencies of the Parliament of the United Kingdom established in 1868
1868 establishments in Scotland